Fu Chi Fong also (Fu Qifang) (1923 – 16 April 1968) was a Chinese international table tennis player.

Table tennis career
He won a bronze medal at the 1952 World Table Tennis Championships in the Swaythling Cup (men's team event) when representing Hong Kong. Five years later he won another bronze at the 1957 World Table Tennis Championships in the Swaythling Cup (men's team event) with Hu Ping-chuan, Chiang Yung-Ning, Wang Chuanyao and Zhuang Jiafu for China.

Personal life
He was born in Yin County, Zhejiang, and lived in Hong Kong for some time before returning to mainland China. During the Cultural Revolution he, along with fellow table tennis players Jiang Yongning and Yong Guotang, was accused of being a spy simply for the fact that he was originally from Hong Kong. Due to the public humiliation and physical torture inflicted upon him, he was driven to suicide by hanging in Beijing in 1968. Chiang Yung-Ning and Yong Guaotang were also forced into suicide by the same public harassment and torture. He was politically rehabilitated in 1978.

See also
 List of table tennis players
 List of World Table Tennis Championships medalists

References

1923 births
1968 deaths
Hong Kong male table tennis players
Sportspeople from Ningbo
Suicides during the Cultural Revolution
Table tennis players from Zhejiang
Chinese male table tennis players
Suicides by hanging in China
Communist rehabilitations